This is an as yet incomplete list of listed buildings in England, which are the majority of the listed buildings of the United Kingdom.

The organisation of the lists in this series is on the same basis as the statutory register. County names are those used in the register, broadly based on the ceremonial counties and not always matching the current administrative areas.

Grade I listed buildings in England
At the end of 2010 there were approximately 374,081 listed buildings in England and 2.5% of these are categorized as Grade I.

See also 
Grade I listed buildings in Bath and North East Somerset
Grade I listed buildings in Brighton and Hove
Grade I listed buildings in City of Bradford
Grade I listed buildings in Mendip
Grade I listed buildings in North Somerset
Grade I listed buildings in Liverpool
Grade I listed buildings in Sedgemoor
Grade I listed buildings in South Somerset
Grade I listed buildings in Taunton Deane
Grade I listed buildings in West Somerset

Notes

Grade II* listed buildings in England
At the end of 2010 there were approximately 374,081 listed buildings entries in England and 5.5% of these are categorized as Grade II*.

See also 
Grade II* listed buildings in Brighton and Hove
Grade II* listed buildings in Liverpool - City Centre
Grade II* listed buildings in Liverpool - Suburbs

Listed buildings in England by county or locality

Bedfordshire

Bedford

 Listed buildings in Bedford
 Listed buildings in Biddenham
 Listed buildings in Bletsoe
 Listed buildings in Bolnhurst and Keysoe
 Listed buildings in Bromham, Bedfordshire
 Listed buildings in Cardington, Bedfordshire
 Listed buildings in Carlton with Chellington
 Listed buildings in Clapham, Bedfordshire
 Listed buildings in Colmworth
 Listed buildings in Cople
 Listed buildings in Dean and Shelton
 Listed buildings in Eastcotts
 Listed buildings in Elstow
 Listed buildings in Felmersham
 Listed buildings in Great Barford
 Listed buildings in Great Denham
 Listed buildings in Harrold, Bedfordshire
 Listed buildings in Kempston
 Listed buildings in Kempston Rural
 Listed buildings in Knotting and Souldrop
 Listed buildings in Little Barford
 Listed buildings in Little Staughton
 Listed buildings in Melchbourne and Yielden
 Listed buildings in Milton Ernest
 Listed buildings in Oakley, Bedfordshire
 Listed buildings in Odell, Bedfordshire
 Listed buildings in Pavenham
 Listed buildings in Pertenhall
 Listed buildings in Podington
 Listed buildings in Ravensden
 Listed buildings in Renhold
 Listed buildings in Riseley, Bedfordshire
 Listed buildings in Roxton, Bedfordshire
 Listed buildings in Sharnbrook
 Listed buildings in Stagsden
 Listed buildings in Staploe
 Listed buildings in Stevington
 Listed buildings in Stewartby
 Listed buildings in Swineshead, Bedfordshire
 Listed buildings in Thurleigh
 Listed buildings in Turvey, Bedfordshire
 Listed buildings in Wilden, Bedfordshire
 Listed buildings in Willington, Bedfordshire
 Listed buildings in Wilshamstead
 Listed buildings in Wixams
 Listed buildings in Wootton, Bedfordshire
 Listed buildings in Wyboston, Chawston and Colesden
 Listed buildings in Wymington

Luton
Listed buildings in Luton

Bristol
Grade II listed buildings in Bristol

Cheshire

 Listed buildings in Acton, Cheshire
 Listed buildings in Acton Bridge
 Listed buildings in Adlington, Cheshire
 Listed buildings in Agden, Cheshire West and Chester
 Listed buildings in Alderley Edge
 Listed buildings in Aldersey
 Listed buildings in Aldford
 Listed buildings in Allostock
 Listed buildings in Alpraham
 Listed buildings in Alsager
 Listed buildings in Alvanley
 Listed buildings in Anderton with Marbury
 Listed buildings in Antrobus
 Listed buildings in Appleton, Cheshire
 Listed buildings in Ashley, Cheshire
 Listed buildings in Ashton Hayes
 Listed buildings in Aston by Budworth
 Listed buildings in Aston-by-Sutton
 Listed buildings in Aston juxta Mondrum
 Listed buildings in Audlem
 Listed buildings in Austerson
 Listed buildings in Backford
 Listed buildings in Baddiley
 Listed buildings in Baddington
 Listed buildings in Barnton, Cheshire
 Listed buildings in Barrow, Cheshire
 Listed buildings in Barthomley
 Listed buildings in Barton, Cheshire
 Listed buildings in Batherton
 Listed buildings in Beeston, Cheshire
 Listed buildings in Betchton
 Listed buildings in Bickerton, Cheshire
 Listed buildings in Bickley, Cheshire
 Listed buildings in Birchwood
 Listed buildings in Bollington
 Listed buildings in Bosley
 Listed buildings in Bostock
 Listed buildings in Bradley, Cheshire
 Listed buildings in Bradwall
 Listed buildings in Brereton, Cheshire
 Listed buildings in Brindley
 Listed buildings in Broomhall
 Listed buildings in Broxton, Cheshire
 Listed buildings in Bruen Stapleford
 Listed buildings in Buerton, Cheshire West and Chester
 Listed buildings in Buerton, Cheshire East
 Listed buildings in Bulkeley
 Listed buildings in Bunbury, Cheshire
 Listed buildings in Burland
 Listed buildings in Burton (near Tarporley)
 Listed buildings in Burton (near Neston)
 Listed buildings in Burtonwood and Westbrook
 Listed buildings in Burwardsley
 Listed buildings in Byley
 Listed buildings in Calveley
 Listed buildings in Capenhurst
 Listed buildings in Carden, Cheshire
 Listed buildings in Caughall
 Listed buildings in Checkley cum Wrinehill
 Listed buildings in Chelford
 Listed buildings in Chester Castle parish
 Grade II listed buildings in Chester (central)
 Grade II listed buildings in Chester (east)
 Grade II listed buildings in Chester (north and west)
 Grade II listed buildings in Chester (south)
 Listed buildings in Cholmondeley, Cheshire
 Listed buildings in Chorley, Alderley
 Listed buildings in Chorley, Cholmondeley
 Listed buildings in Chorlton, Cheshire West and Chester
 Listed buildings in Chorlton-by-Backford
 Listed buildings in Christleton
 Listed buildings in Church Lawton
 Listed buildings in Church Minshull
 Listed buildings in Church Shocklach
 Listed buildings in Churton by Aldford
 Listed buildings in Churton by Farndon
 Listed buildings in Clotton Hoofield
 Listed buildings in Clutton, Cheshire
 Listed buildings in Coddington, Cheshire
 Listed buildings in Comberbach
 Listed buildings in Congleton
 Listed buildings in Cotton Edmunds
 Listed buildings in Cranage
 Listed buildings in Crewe
 Listed buildings in Crewe Green
 Listed buildings in Croft, Cheshire
 Listed buildings in Crowton
 Listed buildings in Cuddington, Cheshire
 Listed buildings in Culcheth and Glazebury
 Listed buildings in Darnhall
 Listed buildings in Davenham
 Listed buildings in Delamere, Cheshire
 Listed buildings in Disley
 Listed buildings in Doddington, Cheshire
 Listed buildings in Dodleston
 Listed buildings in Duddon
 Listed buildings in Duckington
 Listed buildings in Dunham on the Hill
 Listed buildings in Dutton, Cheshire
 Listed buildings in Eaton, Cheshire East
 Listed buildings in Eaton, west Cheshire
 Listed buildings in Eccleston, Cheshire
 Listed buildings in Edge, Cheshire
 Listed buildings in Edleston
 Listed buildings in Ellesmere Port
 Listed buildings in Elton, Cheshire
 Listed buildings in Faddiley
 Listed buildings in Foulk Stapleford
 Listed buildings in Frodsham
 Listed buildings in Gawsworth
 Listed buildings in Goostrey
 Listed buildings in Golborne Bellow
 Listed buildings in Golborne David
 Listed buildings in Grappenhall and Thelwall
 Listed buildings in Great Boughton
 Listed buildings in Great Budworth
 Listed buildings in Great Sankey
 Listed buildings in Great Sutton
 Listed buildings in Great Warford
 Listed buildings in Guilden Sutton
 Listed buildings in Hale, Halton
 Listed buildings in Hampton, Cheshire
 Listed buildings in Handley, Cheshire
 Listed buildings in Hankelow
 Listed buildings in Hapsford
 Listed buildings in Hartford, Cheshire
 Listed buildings in Harthill, Cheshire
 Listed buildings in Haslington
 Listed buildings in Hassall
 Listed buildings in Hatherton, Cheshire
 Listed buildings in Hatton, Warrington
 Listed buildings in Haughton, Cheshire
 Listed buildings in Helsby
 Listed buildings in Henbury, Cheshire
 Listed buildings in Henhull
 Listed buildings in High Legh
 Listed buildings in Higher Hurdsfield
 Listed buildings in Holmes Chapel
 Listed buildings in Hoole Village
 Listed buildings in Horton-cum-Peel
 Listed buildings in Hough, Cheshire
 Listed buildings in Hulme Walfield
 Listed buildings in Hunsterson
 Listed buildings in Huntington, Cheshire
 Listed buildings in Hurleston
 Listed buildings in Huxley, Cheshire
 Listed buildings in Ince
 Listed buildings in Kelsall
 Listed buildings in Kettleshulme
 Listed buildings in Kingsley, Cheshire
 Listed buildings in Knutsford
 Listed buildings in Lach Dennis
 Listed buildings in Lea Newbold
 Listed buildings in Ledsham, Cheshire
 Listed buildings in Little Bollington
 Listed buildings in Little Budworth
 Listed buildings in Little Leigh
 Listed buildings in Lostock Gralam
 Listed buildings in Lower Kinnerton
 Listed buildings in Lower Withington
 Listed buildings in Lyme Handley
 Listed buildings in Lymm
 Listed buildings in Macclesfield
 Listed buildings in Macclesfield Forest and Wildboarclough
 Listed buildings of Malpas, Cheshire
 Listed buildings in Manley, Cheshire
 Listed buildings in Marbury cum Quoisley
 Listed buildings in Marlston-cum-Lache
 Listed buildings in Marston, Cheshire
 Listed buildings in Marton, Cheshire
 Listed buildings in Marthall
 Listed buildings in Mere, Cheshire
 Listed buildings in Mickle Trafford
 Listed buildings in Middlewich
 Listed buildings in Millington, Cheshire
 Listed buildings in Minshull Vernon
 Listed buildings in Mobberley
 Listed buildings in Mollington, Cheshire
 Listed buildings in Moreton cum Alcumlow
 Listed buildings in Moston, Cheshire East
 Listed buildings in Mottram St Andrew
 Listed buildings in Mouldsworth
 Listed buildings in Moulton, Cheshire
 Listed buildings in Nantwich
 Listed buildings in Neston
 Listed buildings in Nether Alderley
 Listed buildings in Nether Peover
 Listed buildings in Newbold Astbury
 Listed buildings in Newhall, Cheshire
 Listed buildings in Newton-by-Tattenhall
 Listed buildings in Norbury, Cheshire
 Listed buildings in Norley
 Listed buildings in North Rode
 Listed buildings in Northwich
 Listed buildings in Oakmere
 Listed buildings in Odd Rode
 Listed buildings in Ollerton, Cheshire
 Listed buildings in Over Alderley
 Listed buildings in Overton, Malpas
 Listed buildings in Peckforton
 Listed buildings in Penketh
 Listed buildings in Peover Inferior
 Listed buildings in Peover Superior
 Listed buildings in Pickmere
 Listed buildings in Plumley
 Listed buildings in Poole, Cheshire
 Listed buildings in Pott Shrigley
 Listed buildings in Poulton, Cheshire
 Listed buildings in Poulton-with-Fearnhead
 Listed buildings in Poynton with Worth
 Listed buildings in Prestbury, Cheshire
 Listed buildings in Puddington, Cheshire
 Listed buildings in Pulford
 Listed buildings in Rainow
 Listed buildings in Ridley, Cheshire
 Listed buildings in Rixton-with-Glazebrook
 Listed buildings in Rostherne
 Listed buildings in Rowton, Cheshire
 Listed buildings in Rudheath
 Listed buildings in Runcorn (urban area)
 Listed buildings in Runcorn (rural area)
 Listed buildings in Rushton, Cheshire
 Listed buildings in Saighton
 Listed buildings in Sandbach
 Listed buildings in Saughall
 Listed buildings in Shavington cum Gresty
 Listed buildings in Shocklach Oviatt
 Listed buildings in Shotwick
 Listed buildings in Shotwick Park
 Listed buildings in Siddington, Cheshire
 Listed buildings in Smallwood, Cheshire
 Listed buildings in Snelson, Cheshire
 Listed buildings in Somerford Booths
 Listed buildings in Sound, Cheshire
 Listed buildings in Sproston
 Listed buildings in Spurstow
 Listed buildings in Stanthorne
 Listed buildings in Stapeley
 Listed buildings in Stoak
 Listed buildings in Stockton Heath
 Listed buildings in Stoke, Cheshire East
 Listed buildings in Stretton, Cheshire West and Chester
 Listed buildings in Stretton, Warrington
 Listed buildings in Sutton, Cheshire East
 Listed buildings in Sutton, Cheshire West and Chester
 Listed buildings in Swettenham
 Listed buildings in Tabley Inferior
 Listed buildings in Tabley Superior
 Listed buildings in Tarporley
 Listed buildings in Tarvin
 Listed buildings in Tattenhall
 Listed buildings in Tatton, Cheshire
 Listed buildings in Thornton-le-Moors
 Listed buildings in Threapwood
 Listed buildings in Tilston
 Listed buildings in Tilstone Fearnall
 Listed buildings in Tiverton, Cheshire
 Listed buildings in Toft, Cheshire
 Listed buildings in Tushingham cum Grindley
 Listed buildings in Twemlow
 Listed buildings in Upton-by-Chester
 Listed buildings in Utkinton
 Listed buildings in Walgherton
 Listed buildings in Walton, Cheshire
 Listed buildings in Wardle, Cheshire
 Listed buildings in Warmingham
 Listed buildings in Warrington (unparished area)
 Listed buildings in Waverton, Cheshire
 Listed buildings in Weaverham
 Listed buildings in Wervin
 Listed buildings in Weston, Cheshire East
 Listed buildings in Whitegate and Marton
 Listed buildings in Whitley, Cheshire
 Listed buildings in Widnes
 Listed buildings in Wigland
 Listed buildings in Willaston, Cheshire West
 Listed buildings in Willington, Cheshire
 Listed buildings in Wilmslow
 Listed buildings in Wimboldsley
 Listed buildings in Wimbolds Trafford
 Listed buildings in Wincham
 Listed buildings in Wincle
 Listed buildings in Winsford
 Listed buildings in Winwick, Cheshire
 Listed buildings in Wirswall
 Listed buildings in Wistaston
 Listed buildings in Woolston, Cheshire
 Listed buildings in Worleston
 Listed buildings in Wrenbury cum Frith
 Listed buildings in Wybunbury
 Listed buildings in Wychough

Cumbria

Allerdale

Listed buildings in Above Derwent
Listed buildings in Aikton
Listed buildings in Allhallows, Cumbria
Listed buildings in Allonby
Listed buildings in Aspatria
Listed buildings in Bassenthwaite
Listed buildings in Bewaldeth and Snittlegarth
Listed buildings in Blennerhasset and Torpenhow
Listed buildings in Blindbothel
Listed buildings in Blindcrake
Listed buildings in Boltons
Listed buildings in Borrowdale
Listed buildings in Bothel and Threapland
Listed buildings in Bowness
Listed buildings in Bridekirk
Listed buildings in Brigham, Cumbria
Listed buildings in Bromfield, Cumbria
Listed buildings in Broughton, Cumbria
Listed buildings in Broughton Moor
Listed buildings in Buttermere, Cumbria
Listed buildings in Caldbeck
Listed buildings in Camerton, Cumbria
Listed buildings in Cockermouth
Listed buildings in Crosscanonby
Listed buildings in Dean, Cumbria
Listed buildings in Dundraw
Listed buildings in Embleton, Cumbria
Listed buildings in Gilcrux
Listed buildings in Greysouthen
Listed buildings in Hayton, Allerdale
Listed buildings in Holme Abbey
Listed buildings in Holme East Waver
Listed buildings in Holme Low
Listed buildings in Holme St Cuthbert
Listed buildings in Ireby and Uldale
Listed buildings in Keswick, Cumbria
Listed buildings in Kirkbampton
Listed buildings in Kirkbride, Cumbria
Listed buildings in Lorton, Cumbria
Listed buildings in Loweswater, Cumbria
Listed buildings in Maryport
Listed buildings in Oughterside and Allerby
Listed buildings in Papcastle
Listed buildings in Plumbland
Listed buildings in Seaton, Cumbria
Listed buildings in Sebergham
Listed buildings in Setmurthy
Listed buildings in Silloth-on-Solway
Listed buildings in Thursby
Listed buildings in Underskiddaw
Listed buildings in Waverton, Cumbria
Listed buildings in Westnewton, Cumbria
Listed buildings in Westward, Cumbria
Listed buildings in Wigton
Listed buildings in Winscales
Listed buildings in Woodside, Cumbria
Listed buildings in Workington
Listed buildings in Wythop

Barrow-in-Furness

Listed buildings in Askam and Ireleth
Listed buildings in Barrow-in-Furness
Listed buildings in Dalton Town with Newton
Listed buildings in Lindal and Marton

City of Carlisle

Listed buildings in Arthuret
Listed buildings in Askerton
Listed buildings in Beaumont, Cumbria
Listed buildings in Bewcastle
Listed buildings in Brampton, Carlisle
Listed buildings in Burgh by Sands
Listed buildings in Burtholme
Listed buildings in Carlisle, Cumbria
Listed buildings in Castle Carrock
Listed buildings in Cummersdale
Listed buildings in Cumrew
Listed buildings in Cumwhitton
Listed buildings in Dalston, Cumbria
Listed buildings in Farlam
Listed buildings in Hayton, Carlisle
Listed buildings in Hethersgill
Listed buildings in Irthington
Listed buildings in Kingmoor
Listed buildings in Kingwater
Listed buildings in Kirkandrews
Listed buildings in Kirklinton Middle
Listed buildings in Nether Denton
Listed buildings in Orton, Carlisle
Listed buildings in Rockcliffe, Cumbria
Listed buildings in Scaleby
Listed buildings in Solport
Listed buildings in St Cuthbert Without
Listed buildings in Stanwix Rural
Listed buildings in Stapleton, Cumbria
Listed buildings in Upper Denton
Listed buildings in Waterhead, Carlisle
Listed buildings in Westlinton
Listed buildings in Wetheral

Copeland

Listed buildings in Arlecdon and Frizington
Listed buildings in Bootle, Cumbria
Listed buildings in Cleator Moor
Listed buildings in Distington
Listed buildings in Drigg and Carleton
Listed buildings in Egremont, Cumbria
Listed buildings in Ennerdale and Kinniside
Listed buildings in Eskdale, Cumbria
Listed buildings in Gosforth, Cumbria
Listed buildings in Haile, Cumbria
Listed buildings in Irton with Santon
Listed buildings in Lamplugh
Listed buildings in Millom
Listed buildings in Millom Without
Listed buildings in Moresby, Cumbria
Listed buildings in Muncaster
Listed buildings in Parton, Cumbria
Listed buildings in Ponsonby, Cumbria
Listed buildings in Seascale
Listed buildings in St Bees
Listed buildings in St. Bridget Beckermet
Listed buildings in St. John Beckermet
Listed buildings in Waberthwaite
Listed buildings in Wasdale
Listed buildings in Weddicar
Listed buildings in Whicham
Listed buildings in Whitehaven

Eden

Listed buildings in Ainstable
Listed buildings in Alston Moor
Listed buildings in Appleby-in-Westmorland
Listed buildings in Asby, Eden
Listed buildings in Askham, Cumbria
Listed buildings in Bampton, Cumbria
Listed buildings in Barton, Cumbria
Listed buildings in Bolton, Cumbria
Listed buildings in Brough, Cumbria
Listed buildings in Brougham, Cumbria
Listed buildings in Castle Sowerby
Listed buildings in Catterlen
Listed buildings in Cliburn, Cumbria
Listed buildings in Clifton, Cumbria
Listed buildings in Colby, Cumbria
Listed buildings in Crackenthorpe
Listed buildings in Crosby Garrett
Listed buildings in Crosby Ravensworth
Listed buildings in Culgaith
Listed buildings in Dacre, Cumbria
Listed buildings in Dufton
Listed buildings in Glassonby
Listed buildings in Great Salkeld
Listed buildings in Great Strickland
Listed buildings in Greystoke, Cumbria
Listed buildings in Hartley, Cumbria
Listed buildings in Helbeck
Listed buildings in Hesket, Cumbria
Listed buildings in Hoff, Cumbria
Listed buildings in Hunsonby
Listed buildings in Hutton, Cumbria
Listed buildings in Kaber, Cumbria
Listed buildings in King's Meaburn
Listed buildings in Kirkby Stephen
Listed buildings in Kirkby Thore
Listed buildings in Kirkoswald, Cumbria
Listed buildings in Langwathby
Listed buildings in Lazonby
Listed buildings in Little Strickland
Listed buildings in Long Marton
Listed buildings in Lowther, Cumbria
Listed buildings in Mallerstang
Listed buildings in Martindale, Cumbria
Listed buildings in Matterdale
Listed buildings in Milburn, Cumbria
Listed buildings in Morland, Cumbria
Listed buildings in Mungrisdale
Listed buildings in Murton, Cumbria
Listed buildings in Musgrave, Cumbria
Listed buildings in Nateby, Cumbria
Listed buildings in Newbiggin, Kirkby Thore
Listed buildings in Newby, Cumbria
Listed buildings in Ormside
Listed buildings in Orton, Eden
Listed buildings in Ousby
Listed buildings in Patterdale
Listed buildings in Penrith, Cumbria
Listed buildings in Ravenstonedale
Listed buildings in Shap
Listed buildings in Shap Rural
Listed buildings in Skelton, Cumbria
Listed buildings in Sleagill
Listed buildings in Sockbridge and Tirril
Listed buildings in Soulby
Listed buildings in Stainmore
Listed buildings in Tebay
Listed buildings in Temple Sowerby
Listed buildings in Threlkeld
Listed buildings in Thrimby
Listed buildings in Waitby
Listed buildings in Warcop
Listed buildings in Wharton, Cumbria
Listed buildings in Winton, Cumbria
Listed buildings in Yanwath and Eamont Bridge

South Lakeland

Listed buildings in Aldingham
Listed buildings in Arnside
Listed buildings in Barbon
Listed buildings in Beetham
Listed buildings in Blawith and Subberthwaite
Listed buildings in Broughton East
Listed buildings in Broughton West
Listed buildings in Burton-in-Kendal
Listed buildings in Cartmel Fell
Listed buildings in Casterton, Cumbria
Listed buildings in Claife
Listed buildings in Colton, Cumbria
Listed buildings in Coniston, Cumbria
Listed buildings in Crook, Cumbria
Listed buildings in Crosthwaite and Lyth
Listed buildings in Dent, Cumbria
Listed buildings in Dunnerdale-with-Seathwaite
Listed buildings in Egton with Newland
Listed buildings in Fawcett Forest
Listed buildings in Firbank
Listed buildings in Garsdale
Listed buildings in Grange-over-Sands
Listed buildings in Grayrigg
Listed buildings in Haverthwaite
Listed buildings in Hawkshead
Listed buildings in Helsington
Listed buildings in Heversham
Listed buildings in Hincaster
Listed buildings in Holme, Cumbria
Listed buildings in Hugill
Listed buildings in Hutton Roof, South Lakeland
Listed buildings in Kendal
Listed buildings in Kentmere
Listed buildings in Killington, Cumbria
Listed buildings in Kirkby Ireleth
Listed buildings in Lakes, Cumbria
Listed buildings in Lambrigg
Listed buildings in Levens, Cumbria
Listed buildings in Lindale and Newton-in-Cartmel
Listed buildings in Longsleddale
Listed buildings in Lower Allithwaite
Listed buildings in Lower Holker
Listed buildings in Lowick, Cumbria
Listed buildings in Lupton, Cumbria
Listed buildings in Mansergh, Cumbria
Listed buildings in Meathop and Ulpha
Listed buildings in Middleton, Cumbria
Listed buildings in Milnthorpe
Listed buildings in Natland
Listed buildings in Nether Staveley
Listed buildings in New Hutton
Listed buildings in Old Hutton and Holmescales
Listed buildings in Over Staveley
Listed buildings in Pennington, Cumbria
Listed buildings in Preston Patrick
Listed buildings in Preston Richard
Listed buildings in Satterthwaite
Listed buildings in Scalthwaiterigg
Listed buildings in Sedbergh
Listed buildings in Sedgwick, Cumbria
Listed buildings in Skelsmergh
Listed buildings in Skelwith
Listed buildings in Stainton, South Lakeland
Listed buildings in Staveley-in-Cartmel
Listed buildings in Strickland Ketel
Listed buildings in Strickland Roger
Listed buildings in Torver
Listed buildings in Ulverston
Listed buildings in Underbarrow and Bradleyfield
Listed buildings in Urswick
Listed buildings in Whinfell
Listed buildings in Whitwell and Selside
Listed buildings in Windermere, Cumbria (town)
Listed buildings in Witherslack

Derbyshire

Amber Valley

 Listed buildings in Aldercar and Langley Mill
 Listed buildings in Alderwasley
 Listed buildings in Alfreton
 Listed buildings in Ashleyhay
 Listed buildings in Belper
 Listed buildings in Codnor
 Listed buildings in Crich
 Listed buildings in Denby
 Listed buildings in Dethick, Lea and Holloway
 Listed buildings in Duffield, Derbyshire
 Listed buildings in Hazelwood, Derbyshire
 Listed buildings in Heanor and Loscoe
 Listed buildings in Holbrook, Derbyshire
 Listed buildings in Horsley, Derbyshire, and Horsley Woodhouse
 Listed buildings in Idridgehay and Alton
 LIsted buildings in Ironville
 Listed buildings in Ironville and Riddings Ward
 Listed buildings in Kedleston
 Listed buildings in Kilburn, Derbyshire
 Listed buildings in Kirk Langley
 Listed buildings in Mackworth, Amber Valley
 Listed buildings in Mapperley, Derbyshire
 Listed buildings in Pentrich
 Listed buildings in Quarndon
 Listed buildings in Ripley, Derbyshire
 Listed buildings in Shipley, Derbyshire
 Listed buildings in Shottle and Postern
 Listed buildings in Smalley, Derbyshire
 Listed buildings in South Wingfield
 Listed buildings in Swanwick, Derbyshire
 Listed buildings in Turnditch
 Listed buildings in Weston Underwood, Derbyshire
 Listed buildings in Windley

Bolsover

 Listed buildings in Ault Hucknall
 Listed buildings in Barlborough
 Listed buildings in Blackwell, Bolsover
 Listed buildings in Clowne
 Listed buildings in Elmton with Creswell
 Listed buildings in Glapwell
 Listed buildings in Langwith, Derbyshire
 Listed buildings in Old Bolsover
 Listed buildings in Pinxton
 Listed buildings in Pleasley
 Listed buildings in Scarcliffe
 Listed buildings in Shirebrook
 Listed buildings in South Normanton
 Listed buildings in Tibshelf
 Listed buildings in Whitwell, Derbyshire

Chesterfield

 Listed buildings in Brimington
 Listed buildings in Chesterfield, Derbyshire
 Listed buildings in Staveley, Derbyshire

City of Derby

 Listed buildings in Allestree
 Listed buildings in Alvaston
 Listed buildings in Boulton, Derby
 Listed buildings in Chaddesden
 Listed buildings in Chellaston
 Listed buildings in Darley Abbey
 Listed buildings in Derby (Abbey Ward)
 Listed buildings in Derby (Arboretum Ward)
 Listed buildings in Derby (Blagreaves and Sinfin Wards)
 Listed buildings in Derby (Derwent Ward)
 Listed buildings in Derby (Mackworth Ward)
 Listed buildings in Derby (northern area)
 Listed buildings in Littleover
 Listed buildings in Mickleover
 Listed buildings in Normanton, Derby
 Listed buildings in Spondon

Derbyshire Dales

 Listed buildings in Aldwark, Derbyshire
 Listed buildings in Alkmonton
 Listed buildings in Ashbourne, Derbyshire
 Listed buildings in Ashford-in-the-Water
 Listed buildings in Atlow
 Listed buildings in Bakewell
 Listed buildings in Ballidon
 Listed buildings in Baslow and Bubnell
 Listed buildings in Beeley
 Listed buildings in Biggin by Hulland
 Listed buildings in Birchover
 Listed buildings in Bonsall, Derbyshire
 Listed buildings in Boylestone
 Listed buildings in Bradbourne
 Listed buildings in Bradley, Derbyshire
 Listed buildings in Bradwell, Derbyshire
 Listed buildings in Brailsford
 Listed buildings in Brassington
 Listed buildings in Callow, Derbyshire
 Listed buildings in Calver
 Listed buildings in Carsington
 Listed buildings in Chatsworth, Derbyshire
 Listed buildings in Chelmorton
 Listed buildings in Clifton and Compton
 Listed buildings in Cromford
 Listed buildings in Cubley, Derbyshire
 Listed buildings in Curbar
 Listed buildings in Darley Dale
 Listed buildings in Doveridge
 Listed buildings in Eaton and Alsop
 Listed buildings in Edensor
 Listed buildings in Edlaston and Wyaston
 Listed buildings in Elton, Derbyshire
 Listed buildings in Eyam
 Listed buildings in Fenny Bentley
 Listed buildings in Flagg, Derbyshire
 Listed buildings in Foolow
 Listed buildings in Froggatt, Derbyshire
 Listed buildings in Gratton, Derbyshire
 Listed buildings in Great Hucklow
 Listed buildings in Great Longstone
 Listed buildings in Grindleford
 Listed buildings in Harthill, Derbyshire
 Listed buildings in Hartington Middle Quarter
 Listed buildings in Hartington Nether Quarter
 Listed buildings in Hartington Town Quarter
 Listed buildings in Hassop
 Listed buildings in Hathersage
 Listed buildings in Hazlebadge
 Listed buildings in Highlow
 Listed buildings in Hognaston
 Listed buildings in Hollington, Derbyshire
 Listed buildings in Hopton, Derbyshire
 Listed buildings in Hulland
 Listed buildings in Hulland Ward
 Listed buildings in Hungry Bentley
 Listed buildings in Kirk Ireton
 Listed buildings in Kniveton
 Listed buildings in Little Longstone
 Listed buildings in Litton, Derbyshire
 Listed buildings in Longford, Derbyshire
 Listed buildings in Mapleton, Derbyshire
 Listed buildings in Marston Montgomery
 Listed buildings in Matlock Bath
 Listed buildings in Matlock Town
 Listed buildings in Melbourne, Derbyshire
 Listed buildings in Mercaston
 Listed buildings in Middleton-by-Wirksworth
 Listed buildings in Middleton and Smerrill
 Listed buildings in Monyash
 Listed buildings in Nether Haddon
 Listed buildings in Newton Grange, Derbyshire
 Listed buildings in Norbury and Roston
 Listed buildings in Offcote and Underwood
 Listed buildings in Offerton, Derbyshire
 Listed buildings in Osmaston, Derbyshire Dales
 Listed buildings in Over Haddon
 Listed buildings in Parwich
 Listed buildings in Rodsley
 Listed buildings in Rowland, Derbyshire
 Listed buildings in Rowsley
 Listed buildings in Sheldon, Derbyshire
 Listed buildings in Shirley, Derbyshire
 Listed buildings in Snelston
 Listed buildings in Somersal Herbert
 Listed buildings in South Darley
 Listed buildings in Stanton, Derbyshire
 Listed buildings in Stoney Middleton
 Listed buildings in Sudbury, Derbyshire
 Listed buildings in Taddington
 Listed buildings in Tansley
 Listed buildings in Thorpe, Derbyshire
 Listed buildings in Tideswell
 Listed buildings in Tissington and Lea Hall
 Listed buildings in Wardlow, Derbyshire
 Listed buildings in Wheston
 Listed buildings in Winster
 Listed buildings in Wirksworth
 Listed buildings in Yeaveley
 Listed buildings in Yeldersley
 Listed buildings in Youlgreave

Erewash

 Listed buildings in Breadsall
 Listed buildings in Breaston
 Listed buildings in Dale Abbey
 Listed buildings in Draycott and Church Wilne
 Listed buildings in Ilkeston
 Listed buildings in Little Eaton
 Listed buildings in Long Eaton
 Listed buildings in Ockbrook and Borrowash
 Listed buildings in Risley, Derbyshire
 Listed buildings in Sandiacre
 Listed buildings in Sawley, Derbyshire
 Listed buildings in Stanley and Stanley Common
 Listed buildings in Stanton by Dale
 Listed buildings in West Hallam

High Peak

 Listed buildings in Aston, High Peak
 Listed buildings in Bamford
 Listed buildings in Brough and Shatton
 Listed buildings in Burbage, Derbyshire
 Listed buildings in Buxton
 Listed buildings in Castleton, Derbyshire
 Listed buildings in Chapel-en-le-Frith
 Listed buildings in Charlesworth, Derbyshire
 Listed buildings in Chinley, Buxworth and Brownside
 Listed buildings in Chisworth
 Listed buildings in Derwent, Derbyshire
 Listed buildings in Edale
 Listed buildings in Fairfield, Derbyshire
 Listed buildings in Glossop
 Listed buildings in Green Fairfield
 Listed buildings in Hadfield, Derbyshire
 Listed buildings in Hartington Upper Quarter
 Listed buildings in Hayfield, Derbyshire
 Listed buildings in Hope, Derbyshire
 Listed buildings in Hope Woodlands
 Listed buildings in King Sterndale
 Listed buildings in New Mills
 Listed buildings in Padfield
 Listed buildings in Peak Forest
 Listed buildings in Simmondley
 Listed buildings in Thornhill, Derbyshire
 Listed buildings in Tintwistle
 Listed buildings in Whaley Bridge
 Listed buildings in Whitfield, Derbyshire
 Listed buildings in Wormhill

North East Derbyshire

 Listed buildings in Ashover
 Listed buildings in Barlow, Derbyshire
 Listed buildings in Brackenfield
 Listed buildings in Brampton, North East Derbyshire
 Listed buildings in Calow
 Listed buildings in Clay Cross
 Listed buildings in Dronfield
 Listed buildings in Eckington, Derbyshire
 Listed buildings in Heath and Holmewood
 Listed buildings in Holmesfield
 Listed buildings in Holymoorside and Walton
 Listed buildings in Killamarsh
 Listed buildings in Morton, Derbyshire
 Listed buildings in North Wingfield
 Listed buildings in Pilsley, North East Derbyshire
 Listed buildings in Shirland and Higham
 Listed buildings in Stretton, Derbyshire
 Listed buildings in Sutton cum Duckmanton
 Listed buildings in Tupton
 Listed buildings in Unstone
 Listed buildings in Wessington
 Listed buildings in Wingerworth

South Derbyshire

 Listed buildings in Aston-on-Trent
 Listed buildings in Barrow upon Trent
 Listed buildings in Barton Blount
 Listed buildings in Bretby
 Listed buildings in Burnaston
 Listed buildings in Calke
 Listed buildings in Catton, Derbyshire
 Listed buildings in Cauldwell, Derbyshire
 Listed buildings in Church Broughton
 Listed buildings in Coton in the Elms
 Listed buildings in Dalbury Lees
 Listed buildings in Drakelow
 Listed buildings in Egginton
 Listed buildings in Elvaston, Derbyshire
 Listed buildings in Etwall
 Listed buildings in Findern
 Listed buildings in Foremark
 Listed buildings in Foston and Scropton
 Listed buildings in Hartshorne, Derbyshire
 Listed buildings in Hatton, Derbyshire
 Listed buildings in Hilton, Derbyshire
 Listed buildings in Ingleby, Derbyshire
 Listed buildings in Linton, Derbyshire
 Listed buildings in Lullington, Derbyshire
 Listed buildings in Marston on Dove
 Listed buildings in Netherseal
 Listed buildings in Newton Solney
 Listed buildings in Osleston and Thurvaston
 Listed buildings in Overseal
 Listed buildings in Radbourne, Derbyshire
 Listed buildings in Repton
 Listed buildings in Shardlow and Great Wilne
 Listed buildings in Smisby
 Listed buildings in Swadlincote
 Listed buildings in Stanton by Bridge
 Listed buildings in Sutton on the Hill
 Listed buildings in Swarkestone
 Listed buildings in Ticknall
 Listed buildings in Trusley
 Listed buildings in Twyford and Stenson
 Listed buildings in Walton-on-Trent
 Listed buildings in Weston-on-Trent
 Listed buildings in Willington, Derbyshire
 Listed buildings in Woodville, Derbyshire

Dorset 

Grade I listed buildings in Dorset
Grade II listed buildings in Dorset
Grade II* listed buildings in Dorset
Grade II* listed buildings in Purbeck (district)
Grade II* listed buildings in Bournemouth
Grade II* listed buildings in Christchurch
Grade II* listed buildings in East Dorset
Grade II* listed buildings in North Dorset
Grade II* listed buildings in Poole (borough)
Grade II* listed buildings in West Dorset
Grade II* listed buildings in Weymouth and Portland
Listed buildings in Christchurch, Dorset

East Sussex

Grade I listed buildings in Brighton and Hove
Grade II* listed buildings in Brighton and Hove
Grade II listed buildings in Brighton and Hove: A–B
Grade II listed buildings in Brighton and Hove: C–D
Grade II listed buildings in Brighton and Hove: E–H
Grade II listed buildings in Brighton and Hove: I–L
Grade II listed buildings in Brighton and Hove: M
Grade II listed buildings in Brighton and Hove: N–O
Grade II listed buildings in Brighton and Hove: P–R
Grade II listed buildings in Brighton and Hove: S
Grade II listed buildings in Brighton and Hove: T–V
Grade II listed buildings in Brighton and Hove: W–Z
Listed buildings in Eastbourne

Greater Manchester

Bolton

 Listed buildings in Blackrod
 Listed buildings in Bolton
 Listed buildings in Farnworth
 Listed buildings in Horwich
 Listed buildings in Kearsley
 Listed buildings in Little Lever
 Listed buildings in South Turton
 Listed buildings in Westhoughton

Bury

 Listed buildings in Bury
 Listed buildings in Prestwich
 Listed buildings in Radcliffe, Greater Manchester
 Listed buildings in Ramsbottom
 Listed buildings in Tottington, Greater Manchester
 Listed buildings in Whitefield, Greater Manchester

Manchester

Manchester Grade II (central)
Listed buildings in Manchester-M1
Listed buildings in Manchester-M2
Listed buildings in Manchester-M3
Listed buildings in Manchester-M4
Listed buildings in Manchester-M8
Listed buildings in Manchester-M9
Listed buildings in Manchester-M11
Listed buildings in Manchester-M12
Listed buildings in Manchester-M13
Listed buildings in Manchester-M14
Listed buildings in Manchester-M15
Listed buildings in Manchester-M16
Listed buildings in Manchester-M18
Listed buildings in Manchester-M19
Listed buildings in Manchester-M20
Listed buildings in Manchester-M21
Listed buildings in Manchester-M22
Listed buildings in Manchester-M23
Listed buildings in Manchester-M25 (Manchester district)
Listed buildings in Manchester-M40
Listed buildings in Manchester-M60
Listed buildings in Ringway, Manchester

Oldham

 Listed buildings in Chadderton
 Listed buildings in Failsworth
 Listed buildings in Lees, Greater Manchester
 Listed buildings in Oldham
 Listed buildings in Royton
 Listed buildings in Saddleworth
 Listed buildings in Shaw and Crompton

Rochdale

 Listed buildings in Heywood, Greater Manchester
 Listed buildings in Littleborough, Greater Manchester
 Listed buildings in Middleton, Greater Manchester
 Listed buildings in Milnrow
 Listed buildings in Rochdale
 Listed buildings in Wardle, Greater Manchester

Salford

 Listed buildings in Eccles, Greater Manchester
 Listed buildings in Irlam
 Listed buildings in Salford, Greater Manchester
 Listed buildings in Swinton and Pendlebury 
 Listed buildings in Worsley

Stockport

Listed buildings in Bredbury and Romiley
Listed buildings in Cheadle and Gatley
Listed buildings in Hazel Grove and Bramhall
Listed buildings in Marple, Greater Manchester
Listed buildings in Stockport

Tameside

Listed buildings in Ashton-under-Lyne
Listed buildings in Audenshaw
Listed buildings in Denton, Greater Manchester
Listed buildings in Droylsden
Listed buildings in Dukinfield
Listed buildings in Hyde, Greater Manchester
Listed buildings in Longdendale
Listed buildings in Mossley
Listed buildings in Stalybridge

Trafford

Listed buildings in Altrincham
Listed buildings in Bowdon, Greater Manchester
Listed buildings in Carrington, Greater Manchester
Listed buildings in Dunham Massey
Listed buildings in Hale, Greater Manchester
Listed buildings in Partington
Listed buildings in Sale, Greater Manchester
Listed buildings in Stretford
Listed buildings in Urmston
Listed buildings in Warburton, Greater Manchester

Wigan

Listed buildings in Abram, Greater Manchester
Listed buildings in Ashton-in-Makerfield
Listed buildings in Aspull
Listed buildings in Astley, Greater Manchester
Listed buildings in Atherton, Greater Manchester
Listed buildings in Billinge and Winstanley
Listed buildings in Golborne
Listed buildings in Haigh, Greater Manchester
Listed buildings in Hindley, Greater Manchester
Listed buildings in Ince-in-Makerfield
Listed buildings in Leigh, Greater Manchester
Listed buildings in Orrell, Greater Manchester
Listed buildings in Shevington
Listed buildings in Standish, Greater Manchester
Listed buildings in Tyldesley
Listed buildings in Wigan
Listed buildings in Worthington, Greater Manchester

Hampshire

Listed buildings in Southampton

Lancashire

Blackburn with Darwen

Listed buildings in Blackburn
Listed buildings in Darwen
Listed buildings in Eccleshill, Lancashire
Listed buildings in Hoddlesden
Listed buildings in Livesey
Listed buildings in North Turton
Listed buildings in Pleasington
Listed buildings in Tockholes
Listed buildings in Yate and Pickup Bank

Blackpool
Listed buildings in Blackpool

Burnley

Listed buildings in Briercliffe
Listed buildings in Burnley
Listed buildings in Cliviger
Listed buildings in Habergham Eaves
Listed buildings in Hapton, Lancashire
Listed buildings in Ightenhill
Listed buildings in Padiham
Listed buildings in Worsthorne-with-Hurstwood

Chorley

Listed buildings in Adlington, Lancashire
Listed buildings in Anderton, Lancashire
Listed buildings in Anglezarke
Listed buildings in Bretherton
Listed buildings in Brindle, Lancashire
Listed buildings in Charnock Richard
Listed buildings in Chorley
Listed buildings in Clayton-le-Woods
Listed buildings in Coppull
Listed buildings in Croston
Listed buildings in Cuerden
Listed buildings in Eccleston, Lancashire
Listed buildings in Euxton
Listed buildings in Heapey
Listed buildings in Heath Charnock
Listed buildings in Heskin
Listed buildings in Hoghton
Listed buildings in Mawdesley
Listed buildings in Rivington
Listed buildings in Ulnes Walton
Listed buildings in Wheelton
Listed buildings in Whittle-le-Woods
Listed buildings in Withnell

Fylde

Listed buildings in Bryning-with-Warton
Listed buildings in Elswick, Lancashire
Listed buildings in Freckleton
Listed buildings in Greenhalgh-with-Thistleton
Listed buildings in Kirkham, Lancashire
Listed buildings in Little Eccleston-with-Larbreck
Listed buildings in Lytham
Listed buildings in Medlar-with-Wesham
Listed buildings in Newton-with-Clifton
Listed buildings in Ribby-with-Wrea
Listed buildings in Saint Anne's on the Sea
Listed buildings in Singleton, Lancashire
Listed buildings in Staining, Lancashire
Listed buildings in Treales, Roseacre and Wharles
Listed buildings in Weeton-with-Preese
Listed buildings in Westby-with-Plumptons

Hyndburn

Listed buildings in Accrington
Listed buildings in Altham, Lancashire
Listed buildings in Church, Lancashire
Listed buildings in Clayton-le-Moors
Listed buildings in Great Harwood
Listed buildings in Oswaldtwistle
Listed buildings in Rishton

Lancaster

Listed buildings in Arkholme-with-Cawood
Listed buildings in Bolton-le-Sands
Listed buildings in Borwick
Listed buildings in Burrow-with-Burrow
Listed buildings in Cantsfield
Listed buildings in Carnforth
Listed buildings in Caton-with-Littledale
Listed buildings in Claughton, Lancaster
Listed buildings in Cockerham
Listed buildings in Ellel, Lancashire
Listed buildings in Gressingham
Listed buildings in Halton-with-Aughton
Listed buildings in Heaton-with-Oxcliffe
Listed buildings in Heysham
Listed buildings in Hornby-with-Farleton
Listed buildings in Ireby, Lancashire
Listed buildings in Lancaster, Lancashire
Listed buildings in Leck, Lancashire
Listed buildings in Melling-with-Wrayton
Listed buildings in Middleton, Lancashire
Listed buildings in Morecambe
Listed buildings in Nether Kellet
Listed buildings in Over Kellet
Listed buildings in Over Wyresdale
Listed buildings in Overton, Lancashire
Listed buildings in Priest Hutton
Listed buildings in Quernmore
Listed buildings in Roeburndale
Listed buildings in Scotforth
Listed buildings in Silverdale, Lancashire
Listed buildings in Slyne-with-Hest
Listed buildings in Tatham, Lancashire
Listed buildings in Thurnham, Lancashire
Listed buildings in Tunstall, Lancashire
Listed buildings in Warton, Lancaster
Listed buildings in Wennington, Lancashire
Listed buildings in Whittington, Lancashire
Listed buildings in Wray-with-Botton
Listed buildings in Yealand Conyers
Listed buildings in Yealand Redmayne

Pendle

Listed buildings in Barley-with-Wheatley Booth
Listed buildings in Barnoldswick
Listed buildings in Barrowford
Listed buildings in Blacko
Listed buildings in Bracewell and Brogden
Listed buildings in Brierfield, Lancashire
Listed buildings in Colne
Listed buildings in Earby
Listed buildings in Foulridge
Listed buildings in Goldshaw Booth
Listed buildings in Higham with West Close Booth
Listed buildings in Kelbrook and Sough
Listed buildings in Laneshaw Bridge
Listed buildings in Nelson, Lancashire
Listed buildings in Old Laund Booth
Listed buildings in Reedley Hallows
Listed buildings in Roughlee Booth
Listed buildings in Salterforth
Listed buildings in Trawden Forest

Preston

Listed buildings in Barton, Preston
Listed buildings in Broughton, Lancashire
Listed buildings in Goosnargh
Listed buildings in Grimsargh
Listed buildings in Haighton
Listed buildings in Lea, Lancashire
Listed buildings in Preston, Lancashire
Listed buildings in Whittingham, Lancashire
Listed buildings in Woodplumpton

Ribble Valley

Listed buildings in Balderstone, Lancashire
Listed buildings in Bashall Eaves
Listed buildings in Billington and Langho
Listed buildings in Bolton-by-Bowland
Listed buildings in Bowland Forest High
Listed buildings in Bowland Forest Low
Listed buildings in Bowland-with-Leagram
Listed buildings in Chatburn
Listed buildings in Chipping, Lancashire
Listed buildings in Clayton-le-Dale
Listed buildings in Clitheroe
Listed buildings in Downham, Lancashire
Listed buildings in Dutton, Lancashire
Listed buildings in Easington, Lancashire
Listed buildings in Gisburn
Listed buildings in Gisburn Forest
Listed buildings in Great Mitton
Listed buildings in Grindleton
Listed buildings in Horton, Lancashire
Listed buildings in Hothersall
Listed buildings in Little Mitton
Listed buildings in Longridge
Listed buildings in Mearley
Listed buildings in Mellor, Lancashire
Listed buildings in Middop
Listed buildings in Newsholme, Lancashire
Listed buildings in Newton, Ribble Valley
Listed buildings in Osbaldeston
Listed buildings in Paythorne
Listed buildings in Pendleton, Lancashire
Listed buildings in Read, Lancashire
Listed buildings in Ribchester
Listed buildings in Rimington
Listed buildings in Sabden
Listed buildings in Salesbury
Listed buildings in Sawley, Lancashire
Listed buildings in Simonstone, Lancashire
Listed buildings in Slaidburn
Listed buildings in Thornley-with-Wheatley
Listed buildings in Twiston
Listed buildings in Waddington, Lancashire
Listed buildings in West Bradford, Lancashire
Listed buildings in Whalley, Lancashire
Listed buildings in Wiswell
Listed buildings in Worston

Rossendale

Listed buildings in Bacup
Listed buildings in Haslingden
Listed buildings in Rawtenstall
Listed buildings in Whitworth, Lancashire

South Ribble

Listed buildings in Cuerdale
Listed buildings in Farington
Listed buildings in Hutton, Lancashire
Listed buildings in Leyland, Lancashire
Listed buildings in Little Hoole
Listed buildings in Longton, Lancashire
Listed buildings in Much Hoole
Listed buildings in Penwortham
Listed buildings in Samlesbury
Listed buildings in Walton-le-Dale

West Lancashire

Listed buildings in Aughton, Lancashire
Listed buildings in Bickerstaffe
Listed buildings in Bispham, West Lancashire
Listed buildings in Burscough
Listed buildings in Dalton, Lancashire
Listed buildings in Downholland
Listed buildings in Great Altcar
Listed buildings in Halsall
Listed buildings in Hesketh-with-Becconsall
Listed buildings in Hilldale
Listed buildings in Lathom
Listed buildings in Lathom South
Listed buildings in Newburgh, Lancashire
Listed buildings in Ormskirk
Listed buildings in Parbold
Listed buildings in Rufford, Lancashire
Listed buildings in Scarisbrick
Listed buildings in Skelmersdale
Listed buildings in Tarleton
Listed buildings in Upholland
Listed buildings in Wrightington

Wyre

Listed buildings in Barnacre-with-Bonds
Listed buildings in Bleasdale
Listed buildings in Cabus
Listed buildings in Catterall
Listed buildings in Claughton, Wyre
Listed buildings in Fleetwood
Listed buildings in Forton, Lancashire
Listed buildings in Garstang
Listed buildings in Great Eccleston
Listed buildings in Hambleton, Lancashire
Listed buildings in Inskip-with-Sowerby
Listed buildings in Kirkland, Lancashire
Listed buildings in Myerscough and Bilsborrow
Listed buildings in Nateby, Lancashire
Listed buildings in Nether Wyresdale
Listed buildings in Out Rawcliffe
Listed buildings in Pilling
Listed buildings in Poulton-le-Fylde
Listed buildings in Preesall
Listed buildings in Stalmine-with-Staynall
Listed buildings in Thornton-Cleveleys
Listed buildings in Upper Rawcliffe-with-Tarnacre
Listed buildings in Winmarleigh

Merseyside

 Listed buildings in Aintree Village
 Listed buildings in Bebington
 Listed buildings in Bidston
 Listed buildings in Billinge, Merseyside
 Listed buildings in Birkdale
 Listed buildings in Birkenhead
 Listed buildings in Blundellsands
 Listed buildings in Bold, St Helens
 Listed buildings in Bootle
 Listed buildings in Bromborough
 Listed buildings in Bromborough Pool
 Listed buildings in Churchtown, Merseyside
 Listed buildings in Claughton, Merseyside
 Listed buildings in Cronton
 Listed buildings in Eastham, Merseyside
 Listed buildings in Eccleston, St Helens
 Listed buildings in Formby
 Listed buildings in Gayton, Merseyside
 Listed buildings in Great Crosby
 Listed buildings in Halewood
 Listed buildings in Heswall
 Listed buildings in Hightown, Merseyside
 Listed buildings in Hoylake
 Listed buildings in Huyton with Roby
 Listed buildings in Ince Blundell
 Listed buildings in Irby, Merseyside
 Listed buildings in Kirkby
 Listed buildings in Knowsley, Merseyside
 Listed buildings in Litherland
 Listed buildings in Little Altcar
 Listed buildings in Little Crosby
 Listed buildings in Liverpool
 Listed buildings in Lydiate
 Listed buildings in Maghull
 Listed buildings in Melling, Merseyside
 Listed buildings in New Brighton, Merseyside
 Listed buildings in Noctorum
 Listed buildings in Oxton, Merseyside
 Listed buildings in Port Sunlight
 Listed buildings in Poulton, Bebington
 Listed buildings in Prenton
 Listed buildings in Prescot
 Listed buildings in Rainford
 Listed buildings in Rainhill
 Listed buildings in Raby, Merseyside
 Listed buildings in Rock Ferry
 Listed buildings in Saughall Massie
 Listed buildings in Sefton, Merseyside
 Listed buildings in Seneley Green
 Listed buildings in Southport
 Listed buildings in St Helens, Merseyside
 Listed buildings in Storeton
 Listed buildings in Tarbock
 Listed buildings in Thornton, Merseyside
 Listed buildings in Thornton Hough
 Listed buildings in Thurstaston
 Listed buildings in Tranmere, Merseyside
 Listed buildings in Upton, Merseyside
 Listed buildings in Wallasey
 Listed buildings in Whiston, Merseyside
 Listed buildings in Woodchurch, Merseyside
 Listed buildings in Woodside, Merseyside

Liverpool

Grade II listed buildings in Liverpool-L1
Grade II listed buildings in Liverpool-L2
Grade II listed buildings in Liverpool-L3
Grade II listed buildings in Liverpool-L4
Grade II listed buildings in Liverpool-L5
Grade II listed buildings in Liverpool-L6
Grade II listed buildings in Liverpool-L7
Grade II listed buildings in Liverpool-L8
Grade II listed buildings in Liverpool-L9
Grade II listed buildings in Liverpool-L10
Grade II listed buildings in Liverpool-L11
Grade II listed buildings in Liverpool-L12
Grade II listed buildings in Liverpool-L13
Grade II listed buildings in Liverpool-L14
Grade II listed buildings in Liverpool-L15
Grade II listed buildings in Liverpool-L16
Grade II listed buildings in Liverpool-L17
Grade II listed buildings in Liverpool-L18
Grade II listed buildings in Liverpool-L19
Grade II listed buildings in Liverpool-L24
Grade II listed buildings in Liverpool-L25

Nottinghamshire

Ashfield 

 Listed buildings in Annesley
 Listed buildings in Hucknall
 Listed buildings in Kirkby-in-Ashfield
 Listed buildings in Skegby
 Listed buildings in Sutton-in-Ashfield
 Listed buildings in Teversal

Bassetlaw 

 Listed buildings in Askham, Nottinghamshire
 Listed buildings in Babworth
 Listed buildings in Barnby Moor
 Listed buildings in Beckingham, Nottinghamshire
 Listed buildings in Blyth, Nottinghamshire
 Listed buildings in Bole, Nottinghamshire
 Listed buildings in Bothamsall
 Listed buildings in Hodsock
 Listed buildings in Ordsall, Nottinghamshire
 Listed buildings in Retford
 Listed buildings in Worksop

Broxtowe 

 Listed buildings in Attenborough and Chilwell
 Listed buildings in Awsworth
 Listed buildings in Beeston, Nottinghamshire
 Listed buildings in Bramcote
 Listed buildings in Brinsley

City of Nottingham

Gedling

Mansfield

Newark and Sherwood 

 Listed buildings in Averham
 Listed buildings in Balderton
 Listed buildings in Barnby in the Willows
 Listed buildings in Bathley
 Listed buildings in Besthorpe, Nottinghamshire
 Listed buildings in Bestwood St. Albans
 Listed buildings in Bilsthorpe
 Listed buildings in Bleasby, Nottinghamshire
 Listed buildings in Blidworth
 Listed buildings in Bulcote

Rushcliffe 

 Listed buildings in Aslockton
 Listed buildings in Barton in Fabis
 Listed buildings in Bingham, Nottinghamshire
 Listed buildings in Bradmore, Nottinghamshire

Shropshire

Listed buildings in Abdon, Shropshire
Listed buildings in Acton Burnell
Listed buildings in Acton Round
Listed buildings in Acton Scott
Listed buildings in Adderley
Listed buildings in Alberbury with Cardeston
Listed buildings in Albrighton, Bridgnorth
Listed buildings in All Stretton
Listed buildings in Alveley
Listed buildings in Ashford Bowdler
Listed buildings in Ashford Carbonell
Listed buildings in Astley, Shropshire
Listed buildings in Astley Abbotts
Listed buildings in Aston Botterell
Listed buildings in Aston Eyre
Listed buildings in Atcham
Listed buildings in Badger, Shropshire
Listed buildings in Barrow, Shropshire
Listed buildings in Baschurch
Listed buildings in Bayston Hill
Listed buildings in Bedstone
Listed buildings in Beckbury
Listed buildings in Berrington, Shropshire
Listed buildings in Bettws-y-Crwyn
Listed buildings in Bicton, Shrewsbury
Listed buildings in Billingsley, Shropshire
Listed buildings in Bishop's Castle
Listed buildings in Bitterley
Listed buildings in Boningale
Listed buildings in Boraston
Listed buildings in Boscobel
Listed buildings in Bridgnorth
Listed buildings in Bromfield, Shropshire
Listed buildings in Broseley
Listed buildings in Bucknell, Shropshire
Listed buildings in Buildwas
Listed buildings in Burford, Shropshire
Listed buildings in Burwarton
Listed buildings in Cardington, Shropshire
Listed buildings in Caynham
Listed buildings in Chelmarsh
Listed buildings in Cheswardine
Listed buildings in Chetton
Listed buildings in Child's Ercall
Listed buildings in Chirbury with Brompton
Listed buildings in Church Preen
Listed buildings in Church Pulverbatch
Listed buildings in Church Stretton
Listed buildings in Claverley
Listed buildings in Clee St. Margaret
Listed buildings in Cleobury Mortimer
Listed buildings in Cleobury North
Listed buildings in Clive, Shropshire
Listed buildings in Clun
Listed buildings in Clunbury
Listed buildings in Clungunford
Listed buildings in Cockshutt, Shropshire
Listed buildings in Colebatch, Shropshire
Listed buildings in Condover
Listed buildings in Coreley
Listed buildings in Cound
Listed buildings in Craven Arms
Listed buildings in Cressage
Listed buildings in Culmington
Listed buildings in Deuxhill
Listed buildings in Diddlebury
Listed buildings in Ditton Priors
Listed buildings in Donington, Shropshire
Listed buildings in Eardington
Listed buildings in Easthope
Listed buildings in Eaton-under-Heywood
Listed buildings in Edgton
Listed buildings in Ellesmere Rural
Listed buildings in Ellesmere Urban
Listed buildings in Farlow, Shropshire
Listed buildings in Ford, Shropshire
Listed buildings in Frodesley
Listed buildings in Glazeley
Listed buildings in Great Hanwood
Listed buildings in Great Ness
Listed buildings in Greete
Listed buildings in Grinshill
Listed buildings in Hadnall
Listed buildings in Harley, Shropshire
Listed buildings in Heath, Shropshire
Listed buildings in Highley
Listed buildings in Hinstock
Listed buildings in Hodnet
Listed buildings in Hope Bagot
Listed buildings in Hope Bowdler
Listed buildings in Hopesay
Listed buildings in Hopton Cangeford
Listed buildings in Hopton Castle
Listed buildings in Hopton Wafers
Listed buildings in Hordley
Listed buildings in Hughley, Shropshire
Listed buildings in Ightfield
Listed buildings in Kemberton
Listed buildings in Kenley, Shropshire
Listed buildings in Kinlet
Listed buildings in Kinnerley
Listed buildings in Knockin
Listed buildings in Leebotwood
Listed buildings in Leighton and Eaton Constantine
Listed buildings in Little Ness
Listed buildings in Llanfair Waterdine
Listed buildings in Llanyblodwel
Listed buildings in Llanymynech and Pant
Listed buildings in Longden
Listed buildings in Longnor, Shropshire
Listed buildings in Loppington
Listed buildings in Ludford, Shropshire
Listed buildings in Ludlow (northern area)
Listed buildings in Ludlow (southern area)
Listed buildings in Lydbury North
Listed buildings in Lydham
Listed buildings in Mainstone
Listed buildings in Market Drayton
Listed buildings in Melverley
Listed buildings in Middleton Scriven
Listed buildings in Milson, Shropshire
Listed buildings in Minsterley
Listed buildings in Monkhopton
Listed buildings in Montford, Shropshire
Listed buildings in More, Shropshire
Listed buildings in Moreton Corbet and Lee Brockhurst
Listed buildings in Moreton Say
Listed buildings in Morville, Shropshire
Listed buildings in Much Wenlock
Listed buildings in Munslow
Listed buildings in Myddle and Broughton
Listed buildings in Myndtown
Listed buildings in Nash, South Shropshire
Listed buildings in Neen Savage
Listed buildings in Neen Sollars
Listed buildings in Neenton
Listed buildings in Newcastle on Clun
Listed buildings in Norbury, Shropshire
Listed buildings in Norton in Hales
Listed buildings in Onibury
Listed buildings in Oswestry
Listed buildings in Oswestry Rural
Listed buildings in Petton
Listed buildings in Pimhill
Listed buildings in Pitchford
Listed buildings in Pontesbury
Listed buildings in Prees
Listed buildings in Quatt Malvern
Listed buildings in Ratlinghope
Listed buildings in Richard's Castle (Shropshire)
Listed buildings in Romsley, Shropshire
Listed buildings in Ruckley and Langley
Listed buildings in Rudge, Shropshire
Listed buildings in Rushbury
Listed buildings in Ruyton-XI-Towns
Listed buildings in Ryton, Shropshire
Listed buildings in Selattyn and Gobowen
Listed buildings in Shawbury
Listed buildings in Sheinton
Listed buildings in Sheriffhales
Listed buildings in Shifnal
Listed buildings in Shipton, Shropshire
Listed buildings in Shrewsbury (northwest central area)
Listed buildings in Shrewsbury (southeast central area)
Listed buildings in Shrewsbury (outer areas)
Listed buildings in Sibdon Carwood
Listed buildings in Sidbury, Shropshire
Listed buildings in Smethcott
Listed buildings in St Martin's, Shropshire
Listed buildings in Stanton Lacy
Listed buildings in Stanton Long
Listed buildings in Stanton upon Hine Heath
Listed buildings in Stockton, Worfield
Listed buildings in Stoke St. Milborough
Listed buildings in Stoke upon Tern
Listed buildings in Stottesdon
Listed buildings in Stowe, Shropshire
Listed buildings in Sutton Maddock
Listed buildings in Sutton upon Tern
Listed buildings in Tasley
Listed buildings in Tong, Shropshire
Listed buildings in Uffington, Shropshire
Listed buildings in Upton Cressett
Listed buildings in Upton Magna
Listed buildings in Welshampton and Lyneal
Listed buildings in Wem Rural
Listed buildings in Wem Urban
Listed buildings in Wentnor
Listed buildings in West Felton
Listed buildings in Westbury, Shropshire
Listed buildings in Weston Rhyn
Listed buildings in Weston-under-Redcastle
Listed buildings in Wheathill
Listed buildings in Whitchurch Rural
Listed buildings in Whitchurch Urban
Listed buildings in Whittington, Shropshire
Listed buildings in Whitton, Shropshire
Listed buildings in Whixall
Listed buildings in Wistanstow
Listed buildings in Withington, Shropshire
Listed buildings in Woolstaston
Listed buildings in Woore
Listed buildings in Worfield
Listed buildings in Worthen with Shelve
Listed buildings in Wroxeter and Uppington

Telford and Wrekin

Listed buildings in Chetwynd, Shropshire
Listed buildings in Chetwynd Aston and Woodcote
Listed buildings in Church Aston
Listed buildings in Dawley Hamlets
Listed buildings in Edgmond
Listed buildings in Ercall Magna
Listed buildings in Eyton upon the Weald Moors
Listed buildings in Great Dawley
Listed buildings in Hadley and Leegomery
Listed buildings in Ketley
Listed buildings in Kynnersley
Listed buildings in Lawley and Overdale
Listed buildings in Lilleshall and Donnington
Listed buildings in Little Wenlock
Listed buildings in Madeley, Shropshire
Listed buildings in Newport, Shropshire
Listed buildings in Oakengates
Listed buildings in Preston upon the Weald Moors
Listed buildings in Rodington, Shropshire
Listed buildings in St George's and Priorslee
Listed buildings in Stirchley and Brookside
Listed buildings in The Gorge
Listed buildings in Tibberton and Cherrington
Listed buildings in Waters Upton
Listed buildings in Wellington, Shropshire
Listed buildings in Wrockwardine
Listed buildings in Wrockwardine Wood and Trench

South Yorkshire

Barnsley

 Listed buildings in Barnsley (Central Ward)
 Listed buildings in Barnsley (Kingstone Ward)
 Listed buildings in Barnsley (Old Town Ward)
 Listed buildings in Billingley
 Listed buildings in Brierley and Grimethorpe
 Listed buildings in Cawthorne
 Listed buildings in Cudworth, South Yorkshire
 Listed buildings in Darfield, South Yorkshire
 Listed buildings in Darton
 Listed buildings in Dearne North
 Listed buildings in Dearne South
 Listed buildings in Dodworth
 Listed buildings in Dunford
 Listed buildings in Great Houghton, South Yorkshire
 Listed buildings in Gunthwaite and Ingbirchworth
 Listed buildings in High Hoyland
 Listed buildings in Hoyland Milton
 Listed buildings in Hunshelf
 Listed buildings in Langsett
 Listed buildings in Monk Bretton
 Listed buildings in Oxspring
 Listed buildings in Penistone
 Listed buildings in Penistone East
 Listed buildings in Rockingham
 Listed buildings in Royston, South Yorkshire
 Listed buildings in Silkstone
 Listed buildings in Stainborough
 Listed buildings in Stairfoot
 Listed buildings in Tankersley, South Yorkshire
 Listed buildings in Thurgoland
 Listed buildings in Wombwell
 Listed buildings in Worsbrough
 Listed buildings in Wortley, South Yorkshire

Doncaster

 Listed buildings in Adwick le Street and Carcroft
 Listed buildings in Adwick upon Dearne
 Listed buildings in Auckley
 Listed buildings in Barnburgh
 Listed buildings in Barnby Dun with Kirk Sandall
 Listed buildings in Bawtry
 Listed buildings in Braithwell
 Listed buildings in Brodsworth
 Listed buildings in Burghwallis
 Listed buildings in Cadeby, South Yorkshire
 Listed buildings in Cantley, South Yorkshire
 Listed buildings in Clayton with Frickley
 Listed buildings in Conisbrough and Denaby
 Listed buildings in Doncaster (Balby South Ward)
 Listed buildings in Doncaster (Bentley Ward)
 Listed buildings in Doncaster (Bessacarr Ward)
 Listed buildings in Doncaster (Hexthorpe and Balby North Ward)
 Listed buildings in Doncaster (Town Ward)
 Listed buildings in Doncaster (Wheatley Hills and Intake Ward)
 Listed buildings in Edenthorpe
 Listed buildings in Edlington
 Listed buildings in Fenwick, South Yorkshire
 Listed buildings in Finningley
 Listed buildings in Fishlake
 Listed buildings in Hampole
 Listed buildings in Hatfield, South Yorkshire
 Listed buildings in Hickleton
 Listed buildings in High Melton
 Listed buildings in Hooton Pagnell
 Listed buildings in Kirk Bramwith
 Listed buildings in Loversall
 Listed buildings in Marr, South Yorkshire
 Listed buildings in Mexborough
 Listed buildings in Moss, South Yorkshire
 Listed buildings in Norton and Askern
 Listed buildings in Owston, South Yorkshire
 Listed buildings in Rossington
 Listed buildings in Sprotbrough and Cusworth
 Listed buildings in Stainforth, South Yorkshire
 Listed buildings in Stainton, South Yorkshire
 Listed buildings in Sykehouse
 Listed buildings in Thorne, South Yorkshire
 Listed buildings in Thorpe in Balne
 Listed buildings in Tickhill
 Listed buildings in Wadworth
 Listed buildings in Warmsworth

Rotherham

 Listed buildings in Anston
 Listed buildings in Aston cum Aughton
 Listed buildings in Bramley, Rotherham
 Listed buildings in Brampton Bierlow 
 Listed buildings in Brinsworth
 Listed buildings in Catcliffe
 Listed buildings in Dinnington St. John's
 Listed buildings in Firbeck
 Listed buildings in Gildingwells
 Listed buildings in Harthill with Woodall
 Listed buildings in Hellaby
 Listed buildings in Hooton Levitt
 Listed buildings in Hooton Roberts
 Listed buildings in Laughton en le Morthen
 Listed buildings in Letwell
 Listed buildings in Maltby, South Yorkshire
 Listed buildings in Ravenfield
 Listed buildings in Rawmarsh
 Listed buildings in Rotherham (Boston Castle Ward)
 Listed buildings in Rotherham (East Ward)
 Listed buildings in Rotherham (Hoober Ward)
 Listed buildings in Rotherham (Keppel Ward)
 Listed buildings in Rotherham (Sitwell Ward)
 Listed buildings in Rotherham (West Ward)
 Listed buildings in Rotherham (Wingfield Ward)
 Listed buildings in Swinton, South Yorkshire
 Listed buildings in Thorpe Salvin
 Listed buildings in Thrybergh
 Listed buildings in Thurcroft
 Listed buildings in Todwick
 Listed buildings in Treeton
 Listed buildings in Ulley
 Listed buildings in Wales, South Yorkshire
 Listed buildings in Wath upon Dearne
 Listed buildings in Wentworth, South Yorkshire
 Listed buildings in Whiston, South Yorkshire
 Listed buildings in Wickersley
 Listed buildings in Woodsetts

City of Sheffield

Listed buildings in Midhopestones
Listed buildings in Sheffield
Listed buildings in Sheffield City Centre
Listed buildings in Sheffield S2
Listed buildings in Sheffield S3
Listed buildings in Sheffield S4
Listed buildings in Sheffield S5
Listed buildings in Sheffield S6
Listed buildings in Sheffield S7
Listed buildings in Sheffield S8
Listed buildings in Sheffield S9
Listed buildings in Sheffield S10
Listed buildings in Sheffield S11
Listed buildings in Sheffield S12
Listed buildings in Sheffield S13
Listed buildings in Sheffield S17
Listed buildings in Sheffield S20
Listed buildings in Sheffield S35
Listed buildings in Stocksbridge

Staffordshire

Cannock Chase

Listed buildings in Brereton and Ravenhill
Listed buildings in Brindley Heath
Listed buildings in Cannock
Listed buildings in Heath Hayes and Wimblebury
Listed buildings in Hednesford
Listed buildings in Norton Canes
Listed buildings in Rugeley

City of Stoke-on-Trent

Listed buildings in Stoke-on-Trent

East Staffordshire

Listed buildings in Abbots Bromley
Listed buildings in Anglesey, Staffordshire
Listed buildings in Anslow
Listed buildings in Barton-under-Needwood
Listed buildings in Blithfield
Listed buildings in Branston, Staffordshire
Listed buildings in Burton, Staffordshire (civil parish)
Listed buildings in Burton upon Trent
Listed buildings in Croxden
Listed buildings in Denstone
Listed buildings in Draycott in the Clay
Listed buildings in Dunstall
Listed buildings in Ellastone
Listed buildings in Hanbury, Staffordshire
Listed buildings in Hoar Cross
Listed buildings in Horninglow and Eton
Listed buildings in Kingstone, Staffordshire
Listed buildings in Leigh, Staffordshire
Listed buildings in Marchington
Listed buildings in Mayfield, Staffordshire
Listed buildings in Newborough, Staffordshire
Listed buildings in Okeover
Listed buildings in Outwoods, East Staffordshire
Listed buildings in Ramshorn
Listed buildings in Rocester
Listed buildings in Rolleston on Dove
Listed buildings in Shobnall
Listed buildings in Stanton, Staffordshire
Listed buildings in Stapenhill
Listed buildings in Stretton, East Staffordshire
Listed buildings in Tatenhill
Listed buildings in Tutbury
Listed buildings in Uttoxeter
Listed buildings in Uttoxeter Rural
Listed buildings in Winshill
Listed buildings in Wootton, Staffordshire
Listed buildings in Wychnor
Listed buildings in Yoxall

Lichfield

Listed buildings in Alrewas
Listed buildings in Armitage with Handsacre
Listed buildings in Burntwood
Listed buildings in Clifton Campville
Listed buildings in Colton, Staffordshire
Listed buildings in Curborough and Elmhurst
Listed buildings in Drayton Bassett
Listed buildings in Edingale
Listed buildings in Elford
Listed buildings in Farewell and Chorley
Listed buildings in Fazeley
Listed buildings in Fisherwick
Listed buildings in Fradley and Streethay
Listed buildings in Hammerwich
Listed buildings in Hamstall Ridware
Listed buildings in Harlaston
Listed buildings in Hints, Staffordshire
Listed buildings in Kings Bromley
Listed buildings in Lichfield
Listed buildings in Longdon, Staffordshire
Listed buildings in Mavesyn Ridware
Listed buildings in Shenstone, Staffordshire
Listed buildings in Swinfen and Packington
Listed buildings in Thorpe Constantine
Listed buildings in Wall, Staffordshire
Listed buildings in Weeford
Listed buildings in Whittington, Staffordshire
Listed buildings in Wigginton and Hopwas

Newcastle-under-Lyme

Listed buildings in Audley Rural
Listed buildings in Balterley
Listed buildings in Betley
Listed buildings in Chapel and Hill Chorlton
Listed buildings in Keele
Listed buildings in Kidsgrove
Listed buildings in Loggerheads, Staffordshire
Listed buildings in Madeley, Staffordshire
Listed buildings in Maer, Staffordshire
Listed buildings in Newcastle-under-Lyme
Listed buildings in Silverdale, Staffordshire
Listed buildings in Whitmore, Staffordshire

South Staffordshire

Listed buildings in Acton Trussell, Bednall and Teddesley Hay
Listed buildings in Bobbington
Listed buildings in Brewood and Coven
Listed buildings in Blymhill and Weston-under-Lizard
Listed buildings in Cheslyn Hay
Listed buildings in Codsall
Listed buildings in Coppenhall
Listed buildings in Dunston, Staffordshire
Listed buildings in Enville, Staffordshire
Listed buildings in Essington
Listed buildings in Featherstone, Staffordshire
Listed buildings in Hatherton, Staffordshire
Listed buildings in Hilton, South Staffordshire
Listed buildings in Himley
Listed buildings in Kinver
Listed buildings in Lapley, Stretton and Wheaton Aston
Listed buildings in Lower Penn
Listed buildings in Pattingham and Patshull
Listed buildings in Penkridge
Listed buildings in Perton
Listed buildings in Saredon
Listed buildings in Shareshill
Listed buildings in Swindon, Staffordshire
Listed buildings in Trysull and Seisdon
Listed buildings in Wombourne

Stafford

Listed buildings in Adbaston
Listed buildings in Barlaston
Listed buildings in Berkswich
Listed buildings in Bradley, Staffordshire
Listed buildings in Brocton, Staffordshire
Listed buildings in Chebsey
Listed buildings in Church Eaton
Listed buildings in Colwich, Staffordshire
Listed buildings in Creswell, Staffordshire
Listed buildings in Doxey
Listed buildings in Eccleshall
Listed buildings in Ellenhall
Listed buildings in Forton, Staffordshire
Listed buildings in Fradswell
Listed buildings in Fulford, Staffordshire
Listed buildings in Gayton, Staffordshire
Listed buildings in Gnosall
Listed buildings in Haughton, Staffordshire
Listed buildings in High Offley
Listed buildings in Hilderstone
Listed buildings in Hixon, Staffordshire
Listed buildings in Ingestre
Listed buildings in Marston, Milwich
Listed buildings in Milwich
Listed buildings in Norbury, Staffordshire
Listed buildings in Ranton, Staffordshire
Listed buildings in Salt and Enson
Listed buildings in Sandon and Burston
Listed buildings in Seighford
Listed buildings in Stafford (Central Area)
Listed buildings in Stafford (Outer Area)
Listed buildings in Standon, Staffordshire
Listed buildings in Stone, Staffordshire
Listed buildings in Stone Rural
Listed buildings in Stowe-by-Chartley
Listed buildings in Swynnerton
Listed buildings in Tixall
Listed buildings in Weston, Staffordshire

Staffordshire Moorlands

Listed buildings in Alton, Staffordshire
Listed buildings in Alstonefield
Listed buildings in Bagnall, Staffordshire
Listed buildings in Biddulph
Listed buildings in Blore with Swinscoe
Listed buildings in Bradnop
Listed buildings in Brown Edge
Listed buildings in Butterton
Listed buildings in Caverswall
Listed buildings in Cheadle, Staffordshire
Listed buildings in Checkley
Listed buildings in Cheddleton
Listed buildings in Consall
Listed buildings in Cotton, Staffordshire
Listed buildings in Dilhorne
Listed buildings in Draycott in the Moors
Listed buildings in Endon and Stanley
Listed buildings in Farley, Staffordshire
Listed buildings in Fawfieldhead
Listed buildings in Forsbrook
Listed buildings in Grindon, Staffordshire
Listed buildings in Heathylee
Listed buildings in Heaton, Staffordshire
Listed buildings in Hollinsclough
Listed buildings in Horton, Staffordshire
Listed buildings in Ipstones
Listed buildings in Ilam, Staffordshire
Listed buildings in Kingsley, Staffordshire
Listed buildings in Leek, Staffordshire
Listed buildings in Leekfrith
Listed buildings in Longnor, Staffordshire
Listed buildings in Longsdon
Listed buildings in Oakamoor
Listed buildings in Onecote
Listed buildings in Quarnford
Listed buildings in Rushton, Staffordshire
Listed buildings in Sheen, Staffordshire
Listed buildings in Tittesworth
Listed buildings in Warslow and Elkstones
Listed buildings in Waterhouses, Staffordshire
Listed buildings in Werrington, Staffordshire
Listed buildings in Wetton, Staffordshire

Tamworth

Listed buildings in Tamworth, Staffordshire

West Midlands

Listed buildings in Birmingham

West Sussex

Listed buildings in Adur
Listed buildings in Crawley
Listed buildings in Worthing

West Yorkshire

City of Bradford

Listed buildings in Addingham
Listed buildings in Baildon
Listed buildings in Bingley
Listed buildings in Bradford (Bolton and Undercliffe Ward)
Listed buildings in Bradford (Bowling and Barkerend Ward)
Listed buildings in Bradford (Bradford Moor Ward)
Listed buildings in Bradford (City Ward)
Listed buildings in Bradford (Eccleshill Ward)
Listed buildings in Bradford (Great Horton Ward)
Listed buildings in Bradford (Heaton Ward)
Listed buildings in Bradford (Little Horton Ward)
Listed buildings in Bradford (Manningham Ward)
Listed buildings in Bradford (Royds Ward)
Listed buildings in Bradford (Toller Ward)
Listed buildings in Bradford (Tong Ward)
Listed buildings in Bradford (Trident Parish)
Listed buildings in Bradford (Wibsey Ward)
Listed buildings in Burley in Wharfedale
Listed buildings in Clayton, West Yorkshire
Listed buildings in Cullingworth
Listed buildings in Denholme
Listed buildings in Harden, West Yorkshire
Listed buildings in Haworth, Cross Roads and Stanbury
Listed buildings in Idle and Thackley
Listed buildings in Ilkley
Listed buildings in Keighley
Listed buildings in Menston
Listed buildings in Oxenhope
Listed buildings in Queensbury, West Yorkshire
Listed buildings in Saltaire
Listed buildings in Sandy Lane, West Yorkshire
Listed buildings in Shipley, West Yorkshire
Listed buildings in Silsden
Listed buildings in Steeton with Eastburn
Listed buildings in Thornton and Allerton, West Yorkshire
Listed buildings in Wilsden
Listed buildings in Windhill and Wrose
Listed buildings in Wyke

Calderdale

Listed buildings in Blackshaw
Listed buildings in Brighouse
Listed buildings in Elland
Listed buildings in Erringden
Listed buildings in Greetland and Stainland
Listed buildings in Halifax, West Yorkshire
Listed buildings in Hebden Royd
Listed buildings in Heptonstall
Listed buildings in Hipperholme and Lightcliffe
Listed buildings in Illingworth, West Yorkshire and Mixenden
Listed buildings in Luddendenfoot
Listed buildings in Northowram
Listed buildings in Ovenden
Listed buildings in Rastrick
Listed buildings in Ripponden
Listed buildings in Ryburn
Listed buildings in Shelf, West Yorkshire
Listed buildings in Sowerby Bridge
Listed buildings in Todmorden (inner area)
Listed buildings in Todmorden (outer areas)
Listed buildings in Wadsworth, West Yorkshire
Listed buildings in Warley, West Yorkshire

Kirklees

Listed buildings in Almondbury
Listed buildings in Batley
Listed buildings in Cleckheaton
Listed buildings in Colne Valley (central area)
Listed buildings in Colne Valley (eastern area)
Listed buildings in Colne Valley (western area)
Listed buildings in Crosland Moor and Netherton
Listed buildings in Denby Dale
Listed buildings in Dewsbury
Listed buildings in Golcar
Listed buildings in Heckmondwike
Listed buildings in Holme Valley (central area)
Listed buildings in Holme Valley (outer areas)
Listed buildings in Huddersfield (Ashbrow Ward)
Listed buildings in Huddersfield (Dalton Ward)
Listed buildings in Huddersfield (Greenhead Ward)
Listed buildings in Huddersfield (Lindley Ward)
Listed buildings in Huddersfield (Newsome Ward - central area)
Listed buildings in Huddersfield (Newsome Ward - outer areas)
Listed buildings in Kirkburton
Listed buildings in Liversedge and Gomersal
Listed buildings in Meltham
Listed buildings in Mirfield

City of Leeds

Listed buildings in Aberford and Lotherton
Listed buildings in Alwoodley
Listed buildings in Arthington
Listed buildings in Bardsey cum Rigton
Listed buildings in Barwick in Elmet and Scholes
Listed buildings in Boston Spa
Listed buildings in Bramham cum Oglethorpe
Listed buildings in Bramhope
Listed buildings in Calverley and Farsley
Listed buildings in Carlton, Wharfedale
Listed buildings in Clifford, West Yorkshire
Listed buildings in Collingham, West Yorkshire
Listed buildings in Drighlington
Listed buildings in East Keswick
Listed buildings in Garforth and Swillington
Listed buildings in Gildersome
Listed buildings in Great and Little Preston
Listed buildings in Guiseley and Rawdon
Listed buildings in Harewood, West Yorkshire
Listed buildings in Horsforth
Listed buildings in Kippax, West Yorkshire
Listed buildings in Ledsham, West Yorkshire
Listed buildings in Ledston
Listed buildings in Leeds
Listed buildings in Leeds (Adel and Wharfedale Ward)
Listed buildings in Leeds (Ardsley and Robin Hood Ward)
Listed buildings in Leeds (Armley Ward)
Listed buildings in Leeds (Beeston and Holbeck Ward)
Listed buildings in Leeds (Bramley and Stanningley Ward)
Listed buildings in Leeds (Burmantofts and Richmond Hill Ward)
Listed buildings in Leeds (Chapel Allerton Ward)
Listed buildings in Leeds (City and Hunslet Ward - northern area)
Listed buildings in Leeds (City and Hunslet Ward - southern area)
Listed buildings in Leeds (Cross Gates and Whinmoor Ward)
Listed buildings in Leeds (Farnley and Wortley Ward)
Listed buildings in Leeds (Gipton and Harehills Ward)
Listed buildings in Leeds (Headingley Ward)
Listed buildings in Leeds (Hyde Park and Woodhouse)
Listed buildings in Leeds (Kirkstall Ward)
Listed buildings in Leeds (Middleton Park Ward)
Listed buildings in Leeds (Moortown Ward)
Listed buildings in Leeds (Roundhay Ward)
Listed buildings in Leeds (Temple Newsam Ward)
Listed buildings in Leeds (Weetwood Ward)
Listed buildings in Methley
Listed buildings in Micklefield
Listed buildings in Morley, West Yorkshire
Listed buildings in Otley
Listed buildings in Parlington
Listed buildings in Pool-in-Wharfedale
Listed buildings in Pudsey
Listed buildings in Rothwell, West Yorkshire
Listed buildings in Seacroft and Killingbeck
Listed buildings in Scarcroft
Listed buildings in Shadwell, West Yorkshire
Listed buildings in Sturton Grange
Listed buildings in Thorner and Wothersome
Listed buildings in Thorp Arch
Listed buildings in Walton, Leeds
Listed buildings in Wetherby

City of Wakefield

Listed buildings in Ackworth, West Yorkshire
Listed buildings in Badsworth
Listed buildings in Castleford
Listed buildings in Chevet, West Yorkshire
Listed buildings in Crigglestone
Listed buildings in Crofton, West Yorkshire
Listed buildings in Darrington, West Yorkshire
Listed buildings in East Hardwick
Listed buildings in Featherstone
Listed buildings in Hemsworth
Listed buildings in Hessle and Hill Top
Listed buildings in Horbury and South Ossett
Listed buildings in Huntwick with Foulby and Nostell
Listed buildings in Knottingley and Ferrybridge
Listed buildings in Normanton, West Yorkshire
Listed buildings in North Elmsall
Listed buildings in Notton
Listed buildings in Ossett
Listed buildings in Pontefract
Listed buildings in Ryhill
Listed buildings in Sharlston
Listed buildings in Sitlington
Listed buildings in South Elmsall
Listed buildings in South Hiendley
Listed buildings in South Kirkby and Moorthorpe
Listed buildings in Stanley and Outwood East
Listed buildings in Thorpe Audlin
Listed buildings in Upton, West Yorkshire
Listed buildings in Wakefield
Listed buildings in Walton, Wakefield
Listed buildings in Warmfield cum Heath
Listed buildings in West Bretton
Listed buildings in Woolley, West Yorkshire
Listed buildings in Wrenthorpe and Outwood West

Lists of listed buildings by function
Signal boxes that are listed buildings in England
List of listed London Underground stations
Grade I listed churches by location
Cheshire
Cumbria
Derbyshire
East Riding of Yorkshire
Greater Manchester
Lancashire
Merseyside
Shropshire
Staffordshire
West Yorkshire

See also
List of castles in England
List of abbeys and priories in England
List of country houses in the United Kingdom#England
List of English Renaissance theatres
Listed buildings in Scotland
Listed buildings in Wales
Listed buildings in Northern Ireland

Notes

External links
The National Heritage List for England
Listed buildings by county in England at britishlistedbuildings.co.uk